Sosan may refer to:

Sengcan (died 606), Chinese patriarch
Seosan, Chungnam, a city in South Korea
Seosan Daesa, a Korean warrior monk
Sosan Hotel, hotel in North Korea

People with the surname
Sarah Adebisi Sosan (born 1956), Nigerian politician